Although the term well-behaved statistic often seems to be used in the scientific literature in somewhat the same way as is well-behaved in mathematics (that is, to mean "non-pathological") it can also be assigned precise mathematical meaning, and in more than one way. In the former case, the meaning of this term will vary from context to context. In the latter case, the mathematical conditions can be used to derive classes of combinations of distributions with statistics which are well-behaved in each sense.

First Definition: The variance of a well-behaved statistical estimator is finite and one condition on its mean is that it is differentiable in the parameter being estimated.

Second Definition: The statistic is monotonic, well-defined, and locally sufficient.

Conditions for a Well-Behaved Statistic: First Definition

More formally the conditions can be expressed in this way.  is a statistic for  that is a function of the sample, . For  to be well-behaved we require:

: Condition 1

: Condition 2

Conditions for a Well-Behaved Statistic: Second Definition

Namely, a statistic s is said to be well-behaved if it satisfies the following three statements:
 monotonicity. A uniformly monotone relation exists between s and ? for any fixed seed  – so as to have a unique solution of (1);
 well-defined.
 local sufficiency.  constitutes a true T sample for the observed s, so that the same probability distribution can be attributed to each sampled value. Now,  is a solution of (1) with the seed . Since the seeds are equally distributed, the sole caveat comes from  their independence or, conversely from their dependence on ? itself. An easy way to check this property is by mapping seed specifications into s specifications. The mapping of course depends on ?, but the distribution of  will not depend on ?, if the above seed independence holds – a condition that looks like a local sufficiency of the statistic S.

The remainder of the present article is mainly concerned with the context of data mining procedures applied to statistical inference and, in particular, to the group of computationally intensive procedure that have been called algorithmic inference.

Algorithmic inference

In algorithmic inference, the property of a statistic that is of most relevance is the pivoting step which allows to transference of probability-considerations from the sample distribution to the distribution of the parameters representing the population distribution in such a way that the conclusion of this statistical inference step is compatible with the sample actually observed.

By default, capital letters (such as U, X) will denote random variables and small letters (u, x) their corresponding realizations and with gothic letters (such as ) the domain where the variable takes specifications. Facing a sample , given a sampling mechanism , with  scalar,  for the random variable X, we have

 

for suitable seeds  and parameter ?

Example
For instance, for both the Bernoulli distribution with parameter p and the exponential distribution with parameter ? the statistic  is well-behaved.

and

Vice versa, in the case of X following a continuous uniform distribution on  the same statistics do not meet the second requirement. For instance, the observed sample  gives
.
Hence a master equation  would produce with
a U sample  and a solution . This conflicts with the observed sample since the first observed value should result greater than the right extreme of the X range. The statistic  is well-behaved in this case.

Analogously, for a random variable X following the Pareto distribution with parameters K and A  (see Pareto example for more detail of this case),

and

can be used as joint statistics for these parameters.

As a general statement that holds under weak conditions, sufficient statistics are well-behaved with respect to the related parameters. The table below gives sufficient / Well-behaved statistics for the parameters of some of the most commonly used probability distributions.

References

Statistical inference